A Soldier's Friend is a 2014 children's novel written by Megan Rix and published by Puffin Books.

Plot
The story follows the friendship of a dog, Sammy, and a cat, Mouser, during the First World War.

Reception
The novel was well received. "Lottie Longshanks", reviewing for The Guardian, stated that "the book is well written and easy to read" and that "it brings that time in history to life so vividly." Julia Eccleshare, writing for website 'Love Reading 4 Kids', called it an "exciting and touching story".

Penguin Schools, along with website TeachItPrimary, provide a pack of activities based on the book to use as a teaching resource in primary schools.

References

External links
 

British children's novels
2014 British novels
Novels set during World War I
Children's historical novels
Children's novels about animals
2014 children's books
British children's books
Novels about cats
Novels about dogs
Puffin Books books